The 1952 Utah State Aggies football team was an American football team that represented Utah State University in the Skyline Conference during the 1952 college football season. In their second season under head coach John Roning, the Aggies compiled a 3–7–1 record (3–4 against Skyline opponents), tied for fifth place in the Skyline Conference, and were outscored by opponents by a total of 209 to 121.

Schedule

References

Utah State
Utah State Aggies football seasons
Utah State Aggies football